The Department of Economics is an academic department of the University of Oxford within the Social Sciences Division. Relatively recently founded in 1999, the department is located in the Norman Foster-designed Manor Road Building.

History of Economics in Oxford

Despite the department's relatively recent establishment, Oxford has a long history within Economics.

The 19th century saw an expansion of economics within Oxford, with political economy being offered as an option to Greats students, and the Drummond Chair in Political Economy being established in 1825 at All Souls College, first being held by Nassau William Senior. Other notable 19th century Oxford economists include Arnold Toynbee, Francis Ysidro Edgeworth.

The 20th century saw the first economics programme, a postgraduate Diploma in Economics, in 1904. Economics was later introduced as part of a degree programme as part of the “modern greats” course in 1920, later Philosophy, Politics and Economics. Economist L.L. Price argued that this emphasised Oxford's stance of treating economics “pretty.. but unimportant”. 20th century Oxford economists include Sir Roy Harrod, Jacob Marschak, Nicholas Stern, Sir David Hendry, Stephen Nickell, David Soskice, Tim Harford, and Mark Carney.

Nobel Prizes

Nine academics affiliated with Oxford have won the Nobel Memorial Prize in Economic Sciences:
Sir John Hicks (1972; MA, Balliol; Drummond Professor of Political Economy)
Gunnar Myrdal (1974; Fellow of Balliol)
James Meade (1977; MA, Oriel)
Lawrence Klein (1980; Lincoln)
Robert Solow (1987; George Eastman Visiting Professor; Fellow of Balliol)
Sir James Mirrlees (1996; Edgeworth Professor of Economics; Fellow of Nuffield)
Amartya Sen (1998; Fellow of Nuffield; Drummond Professor of Political Economy; Fellow of All Souls)
Michael Spence (2001; Rhodes Scholar; MA, Magdalen)
Joseph Stiglitz (2001; Drummond Professor of Political Economy; Fellow of All Souls, Visiting Fellow of St Catherine's)

Courses
The department offers three undergraduate courses in economics, but notably no straight economics option:
BA History & Economics, run jointly with the History Faculty
BA Economics & Management, run jointly with the Saïd Business School
BA Philosophy, Politics & Economics, run jointly with the Philosophy Faculty, and Politics Department

At graduate level, the department offers six courses:
MSc Economics for Development, jointly offered by the Department of International Development
MSc Financial Economics, jointly offered by the Saïd Business School
MSc Economic and Social History, jointly offered by the Faculty of History
MPhil in Economics and Social History, jointly offered by the Faculty of History
MPhil Economics
DPhil Economics

Research
In the 2014 Research Excellence Framework (REF2014), the Department received an overall grade-point average of 3.44 (out of 4) - the third highest of any department in Economics and Econometrics in the UK, behind UCL and the London School of Economics.

Research groups and centres
The department currently houses nine research groups, and is involved with five different research centres:

Research groups:

Research centres:
Centre for the Study of African Economies (CSAE) — directed by Stefan Dercon
Oxford Centre for the Analysis of Resource-Rich economies (OxCarre) — directed by Anthony Venables
Economic Modelling (EMoD) at the Institute for New Economic Thinking (INET)
Urbanising in Developing Countries — directed by Anthony Venables, jointly with the London School of Economics
International Growth Centre

Rankings
In the 2021 Complete University Guide, the programme is ranked second nationally, behind the University of Cambridge.

The Tilburg University Economics Ranking is a worldwide ranking of Economics schools based on research contribution placing Oxford second in Europe, and 11th globally.
Similarly, the Academic Ranking of World Universities sees Oxford place third in Europe, and 15th globally.

The 2020 Times Higher Education World University Rankings places Oxford first in the UK, and third globally.

In the 2020 QS World University Rankings by subject, Oxford is ranked second in Europe, and ninth globally for Economics & Econometrics.

Notable current faculty
Current faculty includes the Director of Policy Research at the World Bank, Chief Economists at the Department for International Development, and Members of the Monetary Policy Committee, among many other prominent roles.

Notable former faculty

See also
Faculty of Economics, University of Cambridge
UCL Department of Economics
London School of Economics

References

External links
Social Sciences Division
University of Oxford

Economics
Educational institutions established in 1999
1999 establishments in England